Merle A. Battiste (July 22, 1933 – August 8, 2009) was an American chemist and emeritus Professor of Chemistry at the University of Florida.

Early life and education 
Battiste was born on July 22, 1933, in Mobile, Alabama. His parents were David Theodore Battiste (1895-1987) and Flossie Mae Battiste (nee Older) (1897-1957).  Battiste was the youngest of four  siblings: one which died at infancy (1917-1917), Marion Theodore Battiste (1918-1988), James Melvin Battiste (Mildred), and Marie Wilson. He attended Murphy High School.

Battiste received a B.S. degree from The Citadel, Military College of South Carolina, an M.S. degree in organic chemistry from Louisiana State University at Baton Rouge, under Prof. J. G. Traynham, and a Ph.D. in organic chemistry from Columbia University in 1959. He was Ronald Breslow’s first Ph.D. student.

Career 
After conducting postdoctoral research (1960) with Saul Winstein at the University of California, Los Angeles, and after a short stint in the Army, he joined the faculty at the University of Florida where he remained as a professor of organic chemistry for 42 years, until his retirement in 2004.

Battiste's research focused on the synthesis of novel molecular structures. He published over 130 peer reviewed papers in Organic Chemistry and was known as a dedicated, passionate teacher.

As a passionate teacher, he convinced one of his research assistants, future Nobel Laureate Robert H. Grubbs, to study Organic Chemistry rather than Agriculture Science.

Personal life 
Battiste passed away peacefully at his home Gainesville, FL on Saturday August 8. Battiste survived by his wife, Jan; his sons, Mark and John; his stepdaughters, Tanya, Paula, and Tracey; and six grandchildren. Battiste loved gardening and he was member of the Gainesville Camellia Society for many years.

Awards and honors 
Battiste was a Sloan Fellow, a Fulbright Research Scholar, and an Erskine Fellow. He was also an emeritus member of American Chemical Society, joining in 1959. The University of Florida created the Battiste Award in Synthetic Chemistry.  Originally established in 2005 as the Petra Award for Creative Work in Synthetic Organic Chemistry, the award name was changed in 2007 to honor Professor Battiste.

Memberships 
 1959: American Chemical Society
 Fulbright Research Scholar
 Erskine Fellow

References

External links 
 

2009 deaths
1933 births
Louisiana State University alumni
Columbia Graduate School of Arts and Sciences alumni
University of Florida faculty
The Citadel, The Military College of South Carolina alumni
People from Mobile, Alabama
University of Florida alumni
Scientists from Alabama
20th-century American chemists
21st-century American chemists